The romanization of Japanese is the use of Latin script to write the Japanese language.

Japanese is normally written in a combination of logographic characters borrowed from Chinese (kanji) and syllabic scripts (kana) that also ultimately derive from Chinese characters. 

There are several different romanization systems. The three main ones are Hepburn romanization, Kunrei-shiki romanization (ISO 3602) and Nihon-shiki romanization (ISO 3602 Strict). Variants of the Hepburn system are the most widely used.

Romanized Japanese may be used in any context where Japanese text is targeted at non-Japanese speakers who cannot read kanji or kana, such as for names on street signs and passports and in dictionaries and textbooks for foreign learners of the language. It is also used to transliterate Japanese terms in text written in English (or other languages that use the Latin script) on topics related to Japan, such as linguistics, literature, history, and culture.

All Japanese who have attended elementary school since World War II have been taught to read and write romanized Japanese. Therefore, almost all Japanese can read and write Japanese by using rōmaji. However, it is extremely rare in Japan to use it to write Japanese (except as an input tool on a computer or for special purposes like in some logo design), and most Japanese are more comfortable in reading kanji and kana.

History
The earliest Japanese romanization system was based on Portuguese orthography. It was developed around 1548 by a Japanese Catholic named Anjirō. Jesuit priests used the system in a series of printed Catholic books so that missionaries could preach and teach their converts without learning to read Japanese orthography. The most useful of these books for the study of early modern Japanese pronunciation and early attempts at romanization was the Nippo jisho, a Japanese–Portuguese dictionary written in 1603. In general, the early Portuguese system was similar to Nihon-shiki in its treatment of vowels. Some consonants were transliterated differently: for instance, the  consonant was rendered, depending on context, as either c or q, and the  consonant (now pronounced , except before u) as f; and so Nihon no kotoba ("The language of Japan") was spelled Nifon no cotoba. The Jesuits also printed some secular books in romanized Japanese, including the first printed edition of the Japanese classic The Tale of the Heike, romanized as Feiqe no monogatari, and a collection of Aesop's Fables (romanized as Esopo no fabulas). The latter continued to be printed and read after the suppression of Christianity in Japan (Chibbett, 1977).

From the mid-19th century onward, several systems were developed, culminating in the Hepburn system, named after James Curtis Hepburn who used it in the third edition of his Japanese–English dictionary, published in 1887. The Hepburn system included representation of some sounds that have since changed. For example, Lafcadio Hearn's book Kwaidan shows the older kw- pronunciation; in modern Hepburn romanization, this would be written Kaidan.

As a replacement for the Japanese writing system
In the Meiji era (1868–1912), some Japanese scholars advocated abolishing the Japanese writing system entirely and using rōmaji instead. The Nihon-shiki romanization was an outgrowth of that movement. Several Japanese texts were published entirely in rōmaji during this period, but it failed to catch on. Later, in the early 20th century, some scholars devised syllabary systems with characters derived from Latin (rather like the Cherokee syllabary) that were even less popular since they were not based on any historical use of the Latin script.

Today, the use of Nihon-shiki for writing Japanese is advocated by the Oomoto sect and some independent organizations. During the Allied occupation of Japan, the government of the Supreme Commander for the Allied Powers (SCAP) made it official policy to romanize Japanese. However, that policy  failed and a more moderate attempt at Japanese script reform followed.

Modern systems

Hepburn

Hepburn romanization generally follows English phonology with Romance vowels. It is an intuitive method of showing Anglophones the pronunciation of a word in Japanese. It was standardized in the United States as American National Standard System for the Romanization of Japanese (Modified Hepburn), but that status was abolished on October 6, 1994. Hepburn is the most common romanization system in use today, especially in the English-speaking world.

The Revised Hepburn system of romanization uses a macron to indicate some long vowels and an apostrophe to note the separation of easily confused phonemes (usually, syllabic n  from a following naked vowel or semivowel). For example, the name  is written with the kana characters ju-n-i-chi-ro-u, and romanized as Jun'ichirō in Revised Hepburn. Without the apostrophe, it would not be possible to distinguish this correct reading from the incorrect ju-ni-chi-ro-u. This system is widely used in Japan and among foreign students and academics.

Nihon-shiki

Nihon-shiki romanization was originally invented as a method for Japanese to write their own language in Latin characters, rather than to transcribe it for Westerners as Hepburn was. It follows the Japanese syllabary very strictly, with no adjustments for changes in pronunciation. It has also been standardized as ISO 3602 Strict. Also known as Nippon-shiki, rendered in the Nihon-shiki style of romanization the name is either Nihon-siki or Nippon-siki.

Kunrei-shiki

Kunrei-shiki romanization is a slightly modified version of Nihon-shiki which eliminates differences between the kana syllabary and modern pronunciation. Nihon-shiki, on the other hand, will romanize  as du, but  as zu. See the table below for full details.

Kunrei-shiki has been standardized by the Japanese Government and the International Organization for Standardization as ISO 3602. Kunrei-shiki is taught to Japanese elementary school students in their fourth year of education.

Written in Kunrei-shiki, the name of the system would be rendered Kunreisiki.

Other variants
It is possible to elaborate these romanizations to enable non-native speakers to pronounce Japanese words more correctly. Typical additions include tone marks to note the Japanese pitch accent and diacritic marks to distinguish phonological changes, such as the assimilation of the moraic nasal  (see Japanese phonology).

JSL

JSL is a romanization system based on Japanese phonology, designed using the linguistic principles used by linguists in designing writing systems for languages that do not have any. It is a purely phonemic system, using exactly one symbol for each phoneme, and marking the pitch accent using diacritics. It was created for Eleanor Harz Jorden's system of Japanese language teaching. Its principle is that such a system enables students to internalize the phonology of Japanese better. Since it does not have any of the other systems' advantages for non-native speakers, and the Japanese already have a writing system for their language, JSL is not widely used outside the educational environment.

Non-standard romanization
In addition to the standardized systems above, there are many variations in romanization, used either for simplification, in error or confusion between different systems, or for deliberate stylistic reasons.

Notably, the various mappings that Japanese input methods use to convert keystrokes on a Roman keyboard to kana often combine features of all of the systems; when used as plain text rather than being converted, these are usually known as wāpuro rōmaji. (Wāpuro is a blend of wādo purosessā word processor.) Unlike the standard systems, wāpuro rōmaji requires no characters from outside the ASCII character set.

While there may be arguments in favour of some of these variant romanizations in specific contexts, their use, especially if mixed, leads to confusion when romanized Japanese words are indexed. Note that this confusion never occurs when inputting Japanese characters with a word processor, because input Latin letters are transliterated into Japanese kana as soon as the IME processes what character is input.

Long vowels
In addition, the following three  methods of representing long vowels are authorized by the Japanese Foreign Ministry for use in passports.
This is valid JSL romanization. For Hepburn romanization, it is not a valid romanization if the long vowel belongs within a single word.
This is also an example of wāpuro rōmaji.

Example words written in each romanization system

Differences among romanizations
This chart shows in full the three main systems for the romanization of Japanese: Hepburn, Nihon-shiki and Kunrei-shiki:

This chart shows the significant differences among them. Despite the International Phonetic Alphabet, the /j/ sound in や, ゆ, and よ are never romanized with the letter J.

Spacing

Japanese is written without spaces between words, and in some cases, such as compounds, it may not be completely clear where word boundaries should lie, resulting in varying romanization styles.

Kana without standardized forms of romanization
There is no universally accepted style of romanization for the smaller versions of the vowels and y-row kana when used outside the normal combinations (etc.), nor for the sokuon or small tsu kana  when it is not directly followed by a consonant. Although these are usually regarded as merely phonetic marks or diacritics, they do sometimes appear on their own, such as at the end of sentences, in exclamations, or in some names. The detached sokuon, representing a final glottal stop in exclamations, is sometimes represented as an apostrophe or as t; for example,  might be written as a'! or at!.

Historical romanizations
1603: Vocabvlario da Lingoa de Iapam (1603)
1604: Arte da Lingoa de Iapam (1604–1608)
1620: Arte Breve da Lingoa Iapoa (1620)
1848: Kaisei zoho Bango sen (1848)

Roman letter names in Japanese
The list below shows the Japanese readings of letters in Katakana, for spelling out words, or in acronyms. For example, NHK is read . These are the standard names, based on the British English letter names (so Z is from zed, not zee), but in specialized circumstances, names from other languages may also be used. For example, musical keys are often referred to by the German names, so that B is called  from German B.

Sources: Kōjien (7th edition), Daijisen (online version).

Note: Daijisen does not mention the name vī, while Kōjien does.

See also

 Cyrillization of Japanese
 List of ISO romanizations
 Japanese writing system
 Transcription into Japanese

References

Citations

Sources

Further reading
  Hishiyama, Takehide (菱山 剛秀 Hishiyama Takehide), Topographic Department (測図部). "Romanization of Geographical Names in Japan." (地名のローマ字表記) (Archive) Geospatial Information Authority of Japan.

External links

 An extensive collection of materials relating to rōmaji, including standards documents and HTML versions of Hepburn's original dictionaries.
 The rōmaji conundrum by Andrew Horvat contains a discussion of the problems caused by the variety of confusing romanization systems in use in Japan today.

 
Phonetic guides
Romanization
Japanese writing system